Westfield High School is a public high school in unincorporated Fairfax County, Virginia, United States, west of the Chantilly CDP.

It is a part of Fairfax County Public Schools (FCPS), serving students from the communities including Chantilly and Centreville as well as areas with Herndon addresses in grades 9–12. Opened in 2000, it is the head of the Westfield High School Pyramid in Cluster VIII. Westfield's main building has the same layout as South County High School (Fairfax County, Virginia). At 3,260 students, it is one of the largest four-year high schools in the Commonwealth of Virginia.

The school was listed as the 46th best high school in the United States by Newsweek magazine in 2002 and 27th in the Washington, D.C., metropolitan area by The Washington Post in 2006 due to a high percentage of students enrolled in Westfield's Advanced Placement (AP) classes. Westfield shares a business partnership with Northrop Grumman's business IT group that entails sharing of buildings, as well as financial donations and gifts of supplies. It also shares an education partnership with Centreville Presbyterian Church to improve student achievement.

History
Westfield was first conceived to help deal with the extensive overcrowding at adjacent schools, primarily
Centreville and Chantilly high schools. Plans for Westfield High school originated in 1995 when it was conceived as West County High School. Westfield's colors and mascot were chosen by community members in the months before its grand opening in 2000. By 2005, Westfield had grown so large that it had become one of the largest four-year high schools in Virginia. An additional wing was planned to help deal with the overcrowding, and was completed in summer of 2006.

Regulation 1320.1

Regulation 1320.1 (also known as Guidelines for Restricting Interruptions to Instructional Time—Middle and High Schools) was implemented on April 21, 2004, as an FCPS directive. It was adopted by the county school board to ensure that instructional time in middle and high schools meet limits set by the Virginia Department of Education. The directive limited events such as assemblies and pep rallies by categorizing them as after-school events, with the exception of homecoming pep rallies.

Local radio station DC101's Elliot in the Morning show held a contest in fall 2004 for area high school students whose winners were to host alternative rock band Taking Back Sunday at their school. Westfield students won this contest, whose result was approved by former principal Mike Campbell with the concert date set for Tuesday, November 16. However, students soon learned that a clause in Regulation 1320.1 prohibiting assemblies by business-sponsored groups prevented plans for the concert from being carried out. On Monday, November 15, students began a Taking Back Tuesday movement advocating a schoolwide skip day on the day of the cancelled concert, but it dissolved after Campbell's schoolwide address that afternoon.

Following the incident, students and parents appealed to the school board to return pep rallies to the instructional period and to reconsider the regulation. In a review by the Parent Teacher Student Association, it was found that the school was only allowed one pep rally during the year, adding to the confusion of the situation. In February 2005, FCPS clarified its policy stating that the regulation on pep rallies was not meant to limit school spirit, but the concert remained cancelled.

Violence controversies
Westfield received media attention in the mid-2000s because two murders perpetrated by alumni occurred within one year.

Michael Kennedy, who suffered from schizophrenia, shot and killed Master Police Officer Michael Garbarino and Detective Vicky Armel of the Fairfax County Police Department on May 8, 2006, in an attack on the Sully District Police Station, less than one-half mile from Westfield. On April 5, 2007, Kennedy's father was indicted by a federal grand jury on two counts of drug possession and six counts of weapons charges. The indictment mentioned charges that Kennedy's father illegally possessed marijuana, which made it illegal for him to possess the weapons or ammunition used by Kennedy in the police station attack.

The 2007 Virginia Tech massacre committed by gunman Seung-Hui Cho, an alumnus of Westfield High School, killed thirty-two people, including two Westfield alumnae, Erin Peterson and Reema Samaha. There is no evidence that Cho singled either out during the attack or even knew them. Although Cho's motivation for the shooting is unknown, his suicide note mentioned vague references to his emotional turmoil. While a few students recall instances of Cho being teased and mocked at Westfield, most left him alone and were not aware of his anger. It is unknown if or how much his experience at Westfield contributed to his mental breakdown. Journalists from the international media arrived at Westfield the day Cho's identity was announced, prompting a ban on reporters at six athletic games due "the impact... on school children, academics and other important activities." Criticism of the school's learning environment also prompted students and alumni to rally against the media's biased reporting by emphasizing their many achievements. As a way to honor the two deceased alumnae, the Erin Peterson Fund and Reema J. Samaha Memorial Scholarship Fund were established with the school's support to award scholarships for graduating seniors who best exemplify their personalities.

Drug incidents
In 2008,  incidents involving Westfield alumni purchasing and distributing heroin made local headlines. The first was the death of 19-year-old Alicia Lannes, a graduate of Westfield in 2007, as a result of heroin overdose, which helped spark a federal investigation on heroin and other hard drugs and traffickers in the area.

The second incident occurred on November 20, when ten young adults and teenagers (six of them being Westfield High School alumni, and others attending Virginia Commonwealth University) were arrested as part of the shutdown of a major heroin ring responsible for the deaths of multiple students from Westfield and other local high schools.

It is believed that the death of multiple students (including Alicia Lannes) and the heroin ring were linked.

Campus

Westfield's main structure was designed by Swirnow Structures LLC. The same design was later used for the construction of South County Secondary School in the southern part of Fairfax County, but former Westfield principal Dale Rumberger denied claims of establishing a "mini-Westfield" despite becoming the principal at South County after leaving Westfield in 2004.

The school campus occupies  and is composed of the main building (the "school"), the sports complex including all fields, and the parking lots. The main building currently comprises two levels, with seven main hallways for the classrooms on each level. There are also 18 trailers located around the school. The hallways are listed alphabetically from A-G, and an additional hallway, "R" (for "renovation"), was added onto the school for use beginning in the 2006–07 school year. The heart of the school is the library and media center which currently holds over 21,000 books with room for an additional 4,000. There are over 40 computer stations for student use in the library.

There are four computer labs in Westfield, two on each level, making it among the most technologically advanced of any FCPS high school at the time it was built. There were 1,545 computers at Westfield as of June 2006.

Beyond the main building, there is the sprawling Westfield Sports Complex, including the football stadium, a baseball field, a softball field, six tennis courts, a track which encircles a field for track and field, soccer, and lacrosse, and multiple practice fields. Adjacent to the complex is the Cub Run RECenter, home to Westfield's swim and dive team, although it is not part of the school.

Overcrowding
In the mid-2000s, Westfield was often criticized as grossly overcrowded. The building design provided for a capacity of 2,500 students, a number that was reached in its third year of opening. When the school opened, the unincorporated communities of Centreville and Chantilly experienced a population and real estate boom that was not projected by the county. By the 2004–2005 academic year, the school was over its capacity by 25 percent, and 26 trailers filled the parking lot originally designated for faculty and staff along with additional ground space surrounding the school's main building.

In April 2003, FCPS proposed a bond referendum for the construction of a 124-room addition to Westfield's main building to alleviate the rapid growth of the student population. The bond referendum provided for the construction of the new addition at a cost of $8.7 million. The bond was approved in November of the same year, and construction for the massive new wing began in summer of 2005. Construction was completed in time for the 2006–2007 school year, increasing capacity to 3,100. It has two levels and a basement. It is called the R-hallway.

Some former feeder communities of Westfield were re-zoned to the attendance boundary of South Lakes High School, located in the unincorporated community of Reston.  Due to this boundary adjustment Westfield's enrollment has declined and is currently considered under capacity with a 2013–2014 student membership of 2,750.

Community use
Northern Virginia's New Life Christian Church held services at Westfield after relocating its main campus from Stone Middle School before building and moving to the Zone. Three services are held each Sunday with an attendance of 1,500.

In 2003, the Work Awareness and Transition (WAT) class opened a branch of the Apple Federal Credit Union for students and faculty. The branch is operated by student tellers in WAT.

Hope Chinese School, a Chinese language school in the Washington area, designated Westfield as the site of its Chantilly campus in fall 2006. Chinese language and cultural elective classes are held on Sunday afternoons in the new building addition.

The local area pro women's softball team Washington Glory will call the Westfield Sports Complex home for its 2008 season.  The Glory played the 2007 season at George Mason University's softball complex which is undergoing a renovation during the 2008 season.  The stadium will have increased seating for not only the Glory but also for the Virginia State Softball Championships which will also be hosted at the site along with baseball, lacrosse, soccer and track.

Academics
Westfield's faculty is divided into 10 departments: English, ESOL (English for speakers of other languages), Fine and Performing Arts, Foreign Language, Health and Physical Education, Mathematics, Career and Technical Education (CTE), Science, Social Studies, and Special Education.

As one of 16 Fairfax County high schools that offer the Advanced Placement (AP) Program, Westfield will offer 22 of the 32 AP courses that are offered by the College Board as of the 2007–2008 school year. (The other 8 high schools are designated for the International Baccalaureate Program). In addition, the curriculum also offers Honors courses to prepare students for the rigorous workload associated with AP courses.

Fairfax County's academy system also allows Westfield students to take alternate classes at Chantilly, Edison, Fairfax, Marshall, and West Potomac high schools with transportation provided.

When the school opened, Westfield possessed the newest computer labs and electronic equipment in the county. Westfield's Aerospace Science class is the only one of its kind in FCPS, and its Television Production Lab is the most advanced of any FCPS school. Westfield also offers among the highest number of business-related, technology, and computer classes for any FCPS school, including its notable cooperative education program offered by the Professional and Technical Studies department. The photography and computer graphics labs are among the most complete and advanced in FCPS and provide an extensive array of equipment available for student use. The music technology lab is designed for music theory, and has special software for composing music.

The Foreign Language department offers seven languages for students to study: American Sign Language, French, German, Japanese, Korean, Latin, and Spanish. Human Anatomy and Physiology is a unique course offered for Westfield science students who are interested in pursuing a career in the medical field and would like a more in-depth coverage on human systems than AP Biology.

Westfield's English department provides a number of unique elective courses such as forensics and debate, film study, and a course on William Shakespeare. The Fine and Performing Arts department produced a news program which broadcasts information and upcoming events at or involving Westfield over the school's televisions on a daily basis.

Extracurricular activities

Athletics
Westfield has athletic teams in 19 different sports: baseball, basketball, cheerleading, crew, cross country/track and field, dance team, field hockey, football, golf, gymnastics, ice hockey (club), lacrosse, soccer, softball, swim and dive, tennis, volleyball and wrestling.

The school's athletic program is one of the most successful in the area, having earned numerous titles and championship berths in a wide range of varsity sports since 2000. In fact, Westfield won two state championships in its first year of existence, when both a boy and a girl from the Swim and Dive Team captured individual state swimming honors in Westfield's inaugural winter sports season.

Westfield's football program has been recognized as one of the top programs in the state and has earned five state titles, three seasons ending with perfect records. 
Due to Westfield's large enrollment, the school is categorized 6A-class, as defined by the Virginia High School League. Beginning with the 2017-18 academic year, it belongs to the Concorde District within Region D. The football team won their fourth state championship in 2016 with a double overtime victory over Oscar Smith High School 34-28 and finished 13-2. The boys' outdoor track and field team earned its first Virginia AAA state title in 2004. In 2004, the varsity baseball team reached the state championship final. The boys' soccer team won the district and regional titles in 2005, overall becoming state semifinalists.

On November 26, 2011, the Bulldogs lost to rival Centreville in which Centreville blocked Westfield's field goal with a minute left. The field goal would have sent the game into overtime. This was Centreville's first victory over Westfield since 2001.

The basketball team has had a recent string of success and won the Northern Region championship in 2015. The Bulldogs went on to play in the state championship where they fell short to the Colonial Forge Eagles 47-46. The team finished 27-2. In 2016, the team reached the state final yet again and faced the Oscar Smith Tigers for the second time in a state championship game that year as the football team won states against the Tigers back in the fall. Westfield prevailed with a 74-56 victory and captured the first state title for basketball in school history. The 2016 team finished 26-3.

The girls' lacrosse team won the 2014 VHSL 6A State championship over rival Oakton High School 13-11 and captured their first state championship. The game was played at Lake Braddock Secondary School.

The girls' field hockey team captured the 2013 and the 2017 VHSL State title both with a 2-1 upset over 2x defending champion First Colonial. The games were played at the Virginia Beach sports complex. The 2017 team finished 24-0.

One of the most successful athletic programs at Westfield is the wrestling team, having won eight district championships (2004–2009, 2011-2012), five Northern Region titles (2008-2010, 2012, 2020) and placing frequently in the top ten at the State Tournament.  Westfield wrestling has had at least 1 state champion wrestler for 10 consecutive years (2007-2016).

Westfield's Track Team also won regionals indoor season of 2007 and outdoor season of 2007.

On October 11, 2002, a tremendous downpour postponed a Westfield varsity football game against rival Centreville for the Concorde District championship. Head coach Tom Verbanic, desperate to keep the game on time, had the field covered with tarps and hired a helicopter in an attempt to dry the field. Several thousand dollars later, the game was still postponed until November 17. The match resulted in a win for Westfield, earning the school's first district championship title. The use of the helicopter for drying grass was later criticized heavily.

Varsity football
The varsity football team is revered as one of the most successful programs in Fairfax County and in the state of Virginia since opening their doors in 2000. From their existence onward, the Bulldogs have made four state championship appearances winning all four of them and appearing in 10 regional championship games since 2003. The Bulldogs have also clinched the Concorde District 5 times in 6 years from 2011-2016 with the lone exception in 2013. The Bulldogs completed their first perfect regular season record in 2002.

In 2003, the Bulldogs completed a perfect 14-0 season after winning the northern region championship over rival Robinson 28-7, then winning against the defending state champion C.D. Hylton 24-14 in the state semi-finals before a fantastic 35-14 win over Landstown in the VHSL 6A State Championship game winning them their first state championship in school history.

In 2006, the Bulldogs advanced to the northern region championship game before falling to rival Chantilly 26-21 in the waning moments. Under the guidance of future NFL quarterback Mike Glennon, Westfield achieved another perfect season including a 28-16  win over the Chantilly Chargers and a shutout of rival Centreville 33-0 in the regular season finale.  In the playoffs the Bulldogs won three regional playoff games by a combined margin of 139-54 en route to their second region championship including a 58-34 defeat of the West Springfield Spartans. Once in the state tournament, the Bulldogs faced the heavily favored Oscar Smith Tigers in the state semi-finals. The Bulldogs prevailed 24-21 setting up a matchup against the Woodbridge Vikings. In Scott Stadium at the University of Virginia, the Bulldogs won their 2nd state title in school history.

In 2011, long time football coach Tom Verbanic stepped down and defensive coordinator Kyle Simmons was brought in to fill in as the third head coach in school history. Under his guidance the Bulldogs finished the 2011 season with a 10-0 perfect regular season record and winning their first two playoffs games before ultimately falling to rival Centreville 27-24 in the regional championship due to a blocked field goal.  The Bulldogs ended the season at 12-1.

In 2012, the team once again completed a perfect regular season record including a 40-21 revenge win over Centreville. The Bulldogs won two playoff games before falling to rival Oakton High School in the region title game 23-16 ending their season at 12-1.

In 2013, Westfield finished 2nd in the Concorde district behind rival Centreville with an 8-2 record before rallying to win three playoff games including a 19-16 upset over previously undefeated Lake Braddock before reaching their third straight regional final and second in three years against the Centreville Wildcats But in the regional final, the Bulldogs were soundly defeated by the eventual state champion Wildcats 35-14 due in large part to the Wildcats Wing-T offense that included South Carolina tailback AJ Turner, Cincinnati tailback/fullback Taylor Boose, James Madison defensive back Charles Tutt, and Vanderbilt offensive tackle/guard Justin Skule. The Bulldogs finished the season 11-3.

In 2014, Westfield completed a 9-1 regular season. The Bulldogs would advance to the region championship for the fourth straight year but would lose again to Centreville 21-17 ending their season at 12-2.

In the 2015 season brought, Westfield finished with a 9-1 regular season yet again including a 20-12  win over Centreville and advancing far once again in the playoffs. After defeating Washington-Lee 44-20, South Lakes 24-13, and Lake Braddock 31-7, Westfield would face South County for the region championship, with the Bulldogs taking the title with a 40-8 win over the Stallions. The win propelled the team to the VHSL 6A State Championship against the Oscar Smith Tigers marking only the second time in history that the two schools met. That game went into overtime tied at 28, with Westfield winning their 3rd state championship with a 49-42 win in overtime. The season ended 14-1.

In 2016, Westfield began the season with a 45-0 win over Washington-Lee High School as the defending state champions. However, over the course of the season, the Bulldogs would lose to two 5A powerhouses further adding to the debate of whether the 5A conference was better than the 6A conference. (Lost to Stone Bridge 34-16 and to Briar Woods 35-34). The Bulldogs would finish 8-2 on the regular season and with their 49-21 win over Chantilly in the regular season finale, the Bulldogs clinched their 5th district title in 6 years. The Bulldogs won their first round playoff game against W.T. Woodson 45-7 and defeated South County 20-3 in round 2. The Bulldogs then defeated James Madison High School in the 6A North Region Semi-Finals 31-13 and for the 6th consecutive season competed in the 6A North Region Championship/VHSL 6A State Semi-Finals. The Bulldogs then defeated the South Lakes Seahawks 42-12 to advance to their second straight state title game. At Armstrong Stadium in Hampton, Westfield once again outlasted Oscar Smith 34-28 in double overtime to win their fourth straight championship and second straight title. The win finished the season at 13-2 and Westfield is the first team to win back to back state championships in football since CD Hylton in 1998 and 1999.

In 2017, despite the loss of practically their entire state championship teams starters, the Bulldogs started the season 3-0 including a 28-27 victory over South County. The Bulldogs went on to finish the regular season 10-0 and they won their 5th state title and third in a row over Oscar Smith to finish 15-0 on the season.

In 2018, the team once again finished the regular season undefeated and won their fourth straight regional championship. The season would end a week later with a loss to Freedom 35-28 in the state semi-finals ending a long winning streak and denying them their fourth straight championship.

Boys' basketball
Recently the Bulldogs basketball team has achieved unprecedented success especially from 2015-2016. In 2015, the Bulldogs went on an unprecedented winning streak advancing to the state championship for the first time in school history before falling short to the Colonial Forge Eagles 47-46 ending their miraculous season at 27-2. 2016 brought a new story as the Bulldogs once again advanced to the state title game where they would face the Oscar Smith Tigers in a rematch of that season's football championship won by Westfield 49-42 in 3OT. This time however, it wasn't close as Westfield defeated Oscar Smith 74-56 win their first state championship for basketball in school history. The team finished the season 26-3.

Theatre
Since the showing of its first production, an original creation of The Glass Menagerie, Westfield's theatre arts department has received numerous distinctions. Productions of Godspell and Fiddler on the Roof won Best Musical at the National Capital Area Cappies awards, and Rosencrantz & Guildenstern Are Dead won Best Play. Playwright Sheila Callaghan's Star-Crossed Lovers, a one-act rendition of William Shakespeare's Romeo and Juliet, was conceived by director Scott Pafumi and premiered at Westfield in 2004.

In 2007/08, the department's production of The Wiz was the subject of an ABC News 20/20 special entitled "Drama High" which aired on December 15, 2008. In 2010/11, Westfield's production of Joseph and the Amazing Technicolor Dreamcoat received a record 21 Cappies nominations. The show won 10 Cappies, including Best Musical, Best Song, and Lead Actor in a Musical.

Westfield Theatre has also been invited to perform its own renditions of Romeo and Juliet and The Tempest at the Folger Shakespeare Library, an internationally renowned stage and research center devoted to the life and works of William Shakespeare.

Westfield Summer Stage is an annual training program for middle and high school student actors in Fairfax County. In 2010, the program held the production of 42nd Street. Past programs featured well-known productions such as High School Musical, Bye Bye Birdie, Beauty and the Beast, Grease, Peter Pan, Snoopy, Annie, South Pacific, Guys and Dolls and 42nd Street.

After the retirement of the program's creator, Scott D. Pafumi, the department was taken under the direction of Susan Pike. The shows for the 2012–2013 school year were: Laughingstock in the fall, Flowers for Algernon in the winter and the musical, Urinetown as the final show of the year in the spring. Flowers for Algernon was the school's Cappies show. Cappie winners included Alex Mann and Joe Drzemiecki, who won a creativity Cappie for their original score.

During the year of 2016-2017, Susan Pike retired and Rachel Harrington became the new theater teacher at Westfield. During the spring of 2017, the spring musical Legally Blonde was nominated for 14 Cappies awards. Two years later, the school put on the high school edition of the Broadway musical Rock of Ages as their Cappies show, earning a total of 24 nominations which is also the highest number of nominations earned in all of the Cappies program. At the Cappies Gala that year, they won a total of 8 awards including best musical.

Band
The Band program, headed by Alan P. Johnson and Bill Schnepper, is a nationally recognized program composed of ten performance groups including the Wind Symphony, the Symphonic Band, the Concert Band, the Jazz Ensemble, the after school Jazz Band, two Percussion Ensembles, the Color Guard, the Drumline, and the Marching Bulldogs. Participating in the performance groups are over 200 students and three instructors. The program is supported by the Westfield High School Band Boosters Organization. The organization helps to support the band through its website, www.westfieldband.org, volunteer support, and financial support.

Westfield's band has been named a Virginia Honor Band twelve times for both its marching band and concert bands. The Westfield Percussion Ensemble has performed, by invitation, at a national festival. NSO director Leonard Slatkin has also visited Westfield in 2007 as a guest conductor. Both jazz bands have received awards at the Chantilly Invitational Jazz Festival, where several students were also named for the All-Star Band, including Chandler Comer on trombone, Nicholas Serbu on trumpet, and Joseph Beddoes on drumset. The Jazz Ensemble, led by Bill Schnepper, has won the Chantilly Jazz Festival in 2014 and 2016. The jazz band recently had the help of Alan Baylock, Chief Arranger for the United States Air Force jazz band The Airmen of Note, who composed the piece "Torque" specifically for the Westfield Jazz Band. Both the concert bands and jazz ensembles have traveled to New York City to perform at Carnegie Hall. The bands have received top awards twice at Myrtle Beach, at a Disney competition in Orlando, Florida, and at a competition in Atlanta, Georgia.

Marching Band, which takes place in the summer and fall only and is not an official class, was noted by local TV station WUSA 9 for its exemplary talent. The Marching Band performs its field show during the halftime of football games and participates in various competitions throughout the marching season. There are also color and winter guards that perform with the marching band and in regional tournaments.

In 2013, the marching band was selected as one of 12 high school bands to perform in the 2014 Tournament of Roses parade. It became the first Fairfax County public high school to participate, and only the third Virginia public high school to march in the 125 years of the parade. Upon this achievement, the band has appeared on the news programs of ABC, CBS, and NBC. In addition, the band has been reported on by several newspapers including the Washington Post.

Chandler Comer, a trombone player who graduated with Westfield's class of 2014, has composed several professionally published pieces including "Beyond the Clouds", "Wind Power", and "The Labyrinth". Chandler also composed a four movement piece titled "Dawn of a Nation", which the band performed as part of Comer's final concert as a Westfield student. Chandler now studies and performs at George Mason University with several of his colleagues from Westfield.

In 2015, Alan P. Johnson was hired as the new Director of Bands. In his first year, he relaunched the Winter Guard program and began the Indoor Drumline program. Both of these groups compete during the concert band season. In 2016, the Winter Guard placed first in the Scholastic Regional A2 Division at the Atlantic Indoor Association Virginia Championships. In March 2017, the Wind Symphony performed at the Music for All National Concert Band Festival. This was the second time the group performed at this venue.

Music
The Westfield High School Choral Program consists of students in four different choral ensembles, spanning grades 9 through 12. The choirs have performed for the Governor of Virginia, for an audience of hundreds of music educators at the Virginia Music Educators State Conference, and have performed at the Kennedy Center for the Performing Arts and at Strathmore Hall through a partnership with The Washington Chorus.  The choral program consistently receives superior ratings at local and regional festivals and competitions.  The choir's annual spring competition offers students a chance to perform in renowned music halls across the United States.  Choral students also have the opportunity to participate in two after school choral ensembles, show choir and rock-a-pella choir.  More information can be found at http://westfieldhschoral.org/.

The orchestra is headed by Gregory Rupert, co-principal viola of the Fairfax Symphony Orchestra. The program includes beginning, freshman, concert, chamber, and symphony orchestras.  Orchestra members have also held principal positions in the VBODA Senior Regional and All-State Orchestras.

Westfield hosted the 2007 Mid-Atlantic Guitar Ensemble Festival. The festival featured guitar performances by various schools and learning clinics with noted area musicians such as Andrew York.

The Marching Bulldogs participated in the 2014 Tournament of Roses Parade on January 1, 2014 in Pasadena, California.

Student publications
{{multiple image
| align = right
| image1 = TheGuardian2002-Cover.jpg
| width1 = 125
| alt1 = 
| caption1 = 
| image2 = TheGuardian2002-Athletics.jpg
| width2 = 250
| alt2 = 
| caption2 = 
| footer = Front cover and athletics section divider of The Guardian'''s 2002 issue with the theme "Our World's in Fast Forward". The yearbook was released at the end of Westfield's second year. The National Scholastic Press Association named it one of Best of Show in its annual fall convention.
}}
Westfield's English department is home to three publications.Calliope not only accepts submissions for its literary and art magazine, but it also hosts Coffeehouses in the fall and spring, where student bands, guitarists, and poets perform live. Each year, it also hosts a film festival for videos made by Westfield students. The magazine has been awarded the Gold Circle by the Columbia Scholastic Press Association for its design.The Guardian yearbook in particular has been named a Yearbook Pacemaker Award by the National Scholastic Press Association (NSPA) and has been awarded the Silver Crown by the Columbia Scholastic Press Association. Between 2002–04, the NSPA considered it one of the Best of Show winners in its annual national journalism conventions.The Watchdog newspaper has received an All-Southern'' rating from the Southern Interscholastic Press Association. It also has one of the largest circulations for a high school newspaper in the western Fairfax County area because the newspaper is mailed home to families of students free of charge.

All three publications are noted for their journalistic qualities and their capability in raising a large amount of funding from business advertisement to offset the cost of printing. Workshops on fundraising strategies have been presented by publication advisers at journalism conferences in Virginia.

Clubs and organizations
Honor societies at Westfield include: National Honor Society, National Art Honor Society, National English Honor Society, Spanish National Honor Society, French National Honor Society, German National Honor Society, Japanese Honor Society, National Latin Honor Society, History Honor Society, Mathematics Honor Society, Science Honor Society, Marketing Honor Society, Tri-M, International Thespian Society, and Quill and Scroll.

Both Future Business Leaders of America (FBLA-PBL) and DECA have their own chapters for business and marketing students. The DECA chapter, along with chapters at other FCPS high schools, began a pilot G.O.A.L. (Gaining Occupational Awareness and Learning) Zone internship program in 2003 between FCPS schools and D.C. United.

Westfield High School also has a TSA (Technology Student Association) Chapter that began in 2012.

There are several academic teams competing in regional tournaments as part of the Virginia High School League (VHSL). Westfield's It's Academic team annually competes in tournaments hosted by the VHSL and NBC 4 as well as tournaments hosted by other area schools. The team won its first television match on NBC 4 in the show's 44th season after only its third appearance. The Science Club holds after-school experiments that all students can participate in, and the Science Olympiad team annually competes in the Division C state tournament and has won several medals. The Fellowship of Christian Athletes annually sponsors See You at the Pole for students and faculty.

The Westfield debate and forensics teams have received numerous awards and distinctions. The debate team has been ranked in the top five teams since 2004, and Forensics placed fourth overall in the 2004 VHSL state tournament. The Forensics team also won second place in the Foreign Extemporaneous Speaking individual event at the 2007 state tournament.

In 2007, Westfield and its business partner Northrop Grumman teamed with NASA to participate in the school's first FIRST Robotics Competition at Virginia Commonwealth University for a regional event.

In an effort to show religious diversity, Westfield opened its doors to Cutting EDGE Ministries. It is made up of a diverse group of students who seek to connect their friends to Jesus Christ and a local church.

In 2019, the Westfield High School Politics Club held its first meeting on October 10. The Westfield Politics Club is a catch-all club for students of all political backgrounds and interests open for discussion, discovery, and debate. In 2020, the Westfield Politics Club invited guest speakers Delegate Dan Helmer, Senator Dick Saslaw, and Congressman Gerry Connolly to speak about their experience in working in government and politics.

Students

The largest racial group at Westfield is whites (41%), followed by Hispanic (21%), Asian (20.8%), Black (21.1%), and then Multiracial (4.7%).

As a commitment to the diversity of the Westfield community and to incorporate an FCPS mandate on ethics instruction, the school annually hosts an Ethical Decision Making seminar for sophomores. Sponsored by the Herndon-Dulles Chamber of Commerce and hosted by Westfields Marriott, the seminar has been well received by the community, winning a Blue Ribbon Award for Outstanding Event. The seminar aims at educating students about the dilemma of making ethical decisions by inviting guest speakers from the local community speak to students on race, sexuality, prejudice, and other issues.

Notable alumni

 Justin Bour - first baseman for the Hanshin Tigers of NPB in Japan
 Seung-Hui Cho – gunman responsible for the Virginia Tech massacre
 Blake Francis — professional basketball player for the Capital City Go-Go, formerly for the Westchester Knicks and Raptors 905, and the Richmond Spiders and Wagner Seahawks in college
 Mike Glennon — NFL quarterback for the New York Giants, played for NC State; won WHS football championship in 2007
 Sean Glennon – former quarterback for Virginia Tech Hokies; won WHS football championship in 2003
 Cameron Leahy — lead singer for The Downtown Fiction; started band with past drummer Eric Jones in summer of '08
 Tim Peugh — bassist for Alien Ant Farm, and Crobot
 Eddie Royal — wide receiver; won WHS football championship in 2003
 Evan Royster — running back; won WHS football championship in 2003
 Brandon Snyder – first baseman selected in first round of 2005 Major League Baseball Draft by Baltimore Orioles, currently coaching catchers for the Washington Nationals

References

External links
 
 

Public high schools in Virginia
Westfield High School
Northern Virginia Scholastic Hockey League teams
Educational institutions established in 2000
2000 establishments in Virginia